Manas Manoj Dhamne (born 29 December 2007) is a professional tennis player from India. He made his ATP Tour debut at the 2023 Tata Open. In doing so, he became the first player born in 2007 to play a main draw match on the tour.

Career

Dhamne is from Satana in Maharashtra. He was previously coached in Pune by the wife of Gaurav Natekar. He left India to train with Riccardo Piatti at the Piatti Tennis Center in Bordighera, Italy. In October 2022 he became the youngest Indian to win a junior title at the ITF Asian B1 championships.

2023: ATP debut
He received a wildcard for the Tata Open Maharashtra in January 2023 where he lost to American Michael Mmoh in the first round. Playing in the Boys' singles at the 2023 Australian Open Dhamne was the youngest player to win a first round match when he defeated Jeremy Zhang in straight sets.

Notes

References

Living people
 2007 births
 Indian tennis players